The National Rebirth Alliance (ARN) is a right-wing, Christian conservative political party in Romania. The party's main values are faith, family, and education.

History 
The party was formed in 2019 by lawyer and Coaliția pentru Familie figure, Peter Costea, and his supporters after he failed to enter the European Parliament as an independent in the elections held earlier that year. The relatively new and small party grew in popularity by taking a very anti-abortion attitude, hoping to unite all anti-abortion movements in the country under its leadership.

Ideology 
The party is defined by its predominant right-wing Christian values, most notable being its anti-abortion and traditional family policies. According to Peter Costea, the right to life is the most fundamental human right and seeks to review the Romanian abortion law, saying: "If we discuss the laws for the euthanasia of animals, why not discuss the granting of personality to the unborn?". The law is deemed by him as being illegitimate as it was issued in 1989 by the National Salvation Front Council in the midst of the anti-communist revolution. The party also opposes same-sex marriage, as well as gender ideology, or any form of sex education for children in schools. Peter Costea aims to open for the first time a real debate on what he calls "non-negotiable principles" in Romania.

Electoral history

Legislative elections
The results were the following:

References

Political parties in Romania
Conservative parties in Romania
Protestant political parties
Anti-abortion organizations